Laercio José de Oliveira (born 15 April 1959) more commonly known as Laercio Oliveira is a Brazilian politician. Although born in Pernambuco, he has spent his political career representing Sergipe, having served as senator since 2023 and as congressman from 2011 to 2023.

Personal life
Oliveira is the son of Severina dos Santos Oliveira and Laércio Lopes de Oliveira. At the age of 18 Oliveira moved from Pernambuco to Sergipe. He is a graduate of Faculdade de Administração e Negócios de Sergipe. Oliveira is a member of the Presbyterian church.

Political career
Oliveira voted in favor of the impeachment of then-president Dilma Rousseff. Oliveira voted in favor of the 2017 Brazilian labor reform, and would vote in favor of a corruption investigation into Rousseff's successor Michel Temer.

Electoral history

References

1959 births
Living people
Brazilian Presbyterians
Members of the Chamber of Deputies (Brazil) from Sergipe
Politicians from Recife
Progressistas politicians